Freixenet is a Cava producer, headquartered in Sant Sadurní d'Anoia, Spain. It is the largest producer of traditional method sparkling wine worldwide, and the largest exporter of Cava. The company was founded in 1861 and now belongs to Henkell & Co. Sektkellerei.

History
Freixenet was started after the union of two Catalan families with a lengthy history in winemaking: the Ferrers, owners of La Freixeneda, a 12th-century  farming estate in Sant Quintí de Mediona in the Alt Penedès, and the Salas, winemakers since 1830 and the founders of Casa Sala, a wine exporter to Latin America, in Sant Sadurní d'Anoia.

Towards the end of the 19th century, Dolores Sala Vivé, the granddaughter of the founder of Casa Sala, married Pedro Ferrer Bosch of La Freixeneda. This era saw the gradual loss of Spain’s colonies and grape production diminishing due to the phylloxera plague that had destroyed red grape vines across Europe. Inspired by the success of Champagne, Codorníu and others encouraged vineyard owners to replant with white grape varieties like Macabeu, Parellada and Xarel·lo to use for sparkling wine production. These grapes are still the primary grapes of Cava today though some producers are experimenting with the use of the Champagne wine grapes of Chardonnay and Pinot noir.

As a result, the newlyweds joined forces with Dolores' father to switch the focus of the Sala family business to sparkling wines made under the traditional method, or méthode Champenoise. The name comes from La Freixenada – a family wine producing estate located in the Alt Penedès region since the 13th Century.

In 1941, Freixenet launched its leading product, the Carta Nevada. In 1974, the company achieved international success with another cava, the Cordon Negro. Nowadays Freixenet offers public tours of the winery in which both cavas are produced; visitors are shown the underground cellars and the bottling plant before tasting the finished product. The winery is situated opposite the main train station in the Catalan village of Sant Sadurní d'Anoia. Around 95% of Spain's total Cava production is from Catalonia and Sant Sadurní d'Anoia is home to many of Spain's largest production houses.

Freixenet purchased the Australian Wingara Wine Group in 2008. Wingara owns Katnook Estate in Coonawarra and Deakin Estate in the Murray Darling region near Mildura.

In August 2018, Henkell & Co. Sektkellerei (daughter company of Dr. Oetker) took control of Freixenet after acquiring 50.67% of the shares.

Marketing 
This Cava company taps into a world-famous celebrity to be the face of its much-awaited Christmas TV commercial. Celebrities who have appeared in Freixenet's Christmas sparkling wine include Liza Minnelli (1977), Raquel Welch (1985), Paul Newman (1989), Antonio Banderas and Sharon Stone (1992), Kim Basinger (1993), Penélope Cruz (1994 and 2001), Alejandro Sanz (1998), Pierce Brosnan (2004), Demi Moore (2005) and Shakira (2010).

Freixenet is the main sponsor of the roller hockey (quad) team, Club Esportiu Noia, that usually competes in the main Spanish league and also European Competitions:CERH European League and CERS Cup. Due to this sponsorship agreement the name of the team is CE NOIA Freixenet.
Freixenet is also the official cava of the MotoGP World Championship since 2003.

See also
Gloria Ferrer Caves & Vineyards, Freixenet's California based winery.

References

External links

Freixenet official site

1914 establishments in Spain
Companies based in Catalonia
Spanish brands
Sparkling wines
Wineries of Spain
Dr. Oetker